The Drama of Dresden is a 2005 German television documentary film directed by Sebastian Dehnhardt about the bombing of the city of Dresden in 1945 during World War II.

Awards

References

External links 
 

German documentary films
2005 films
2005 television films
2005 documentary films
Documentary films about World War II
2000s German films